Renu Chakravarti Laskar (born 1932) is an Indian-born American mathematician, specializing in graph theory. She is Professor Emerita of Mathematical sciences at Clemson University. She received her Ph.D. in Mathematics from the University of Illinois at Urbana-Champaign in 1962.

Laskar has often contributed to the theory of domination number and circular arc graphs. She wrote four papers with Paul Erdős, giving her an Erdős number of 1.

Early life and education
Renu C. Laskar was born in Bihar, India. With the help of her family support, she finished her schooling and college, which wasn't much accessible to the women that time due to the cultural norms prevalent in India. It was during that time, when she discovered her talent for mathematics. She finished her Master's degree in Mathematics from B. R. Ambedkar Bihar University in the year 1955. Upon finishing college, Laskar, with strong encouragement from her elder brother, decided to come to the United States to pursue her Ph.D. in the year 1958. She worked for her Ph.D. degree at the University of Illinois at Urbana-Champaign under her advisor Henry Roy Brahana and received her degree in the year 1962. She is the first female Indian to receive a Ph.D. in Mathematics from UIUC. She returned to India after that and joined the Indian Institute of Technology Kharagpur as the first woman faculty at the institute. After three years, Laskar then moved back to the US at University of North Carolina at Chapel Hill and then finally joined Clemson University in the year 1968.

Academic life
Laskar took full advantage of the opportunities she had and set new standards for women in mathematics. She ranks among the top women in discrete mathematics in the number of articles published. According to MathSciNet, she has over 100 publications. Part of the reason for her success in this area is her collaboration network, which included Raj Chandra Bose and  Paul Erdős. She has extended her influence by supervising Ph.D. students. In 1986, Laskar and Steve Hedetniemi organized the Clemson University Discrete Math Miniconference, an event that has drawn an international audience each year since.

References

External links
 Laskar's page at Clemson

Graph theorists
Indian emigrants to the United States
Living people
University of Illinois alumni
Clemson University faculty
20th-century Indian mathematicians
Indian women mathematicians
American women mathematicians
1930 births
20th-century women mathematicians
20th-century Indian women
21st-century American women